This a list of havezates in Drenthe.

See also
 List of castles in the Netherlands#Drenthe

References

Havezates in Drenthe
 2